Dubnica is a village in the municipality of Svilajnac, Serbia. According to the 2002 census, the village had a population of 607.

References

Populated places in Pomoravlje District